The 2002 Texas Longhorns baseball team represented the University of Texas at Austin in the 2002 NCAA Division I baseball season. The Longhorns played their home games at UFCU Disch-Falk Field. The team was coached by Augie Garrido in his 6th season at Texas.

The Longhorns won the College World Series with a 12–6 victory over South Carolina.

Roster

Schedule 

! style="background:#BF5700;color:white;"| Regular Season (43–13)
|- valign="top" 

|- align="center" bgcolor="#ddffdd"
| February 6 ||  || No. 14 || Disch-Falk Field || W 7–1 || Simmons (W; 1–0) || 3,315 || 1–0 || –
|- align="center" bgcolor="#ddffdd"
| February 6 || Concordia || No. 14 || Disch-Falk Field || W 7–1 || Bomer (W; 1–0) || 3,315 || 2–0 || –
|- align="center" bgcolor="ffdddd"
| February 8 || vs.  || No. 14 || Minute Maid Park || L 1–8 || Clark (L; 0–1)|| 12,573 || 2–1 || –
|- align="center" bgcolor="#ddffdd"
| February 9 || vs.  || No. 14 || Minute Maid Park || W 7–6 || McGough (W; 1–0) || 15,428 || 3–1 || –
|- align="center" bgcolor="ffdddd"
| February 10 || vs.  || No. 14 || Minute Maid Park || L 3–4 || Jordan (L; 0–1) || 10,409 || 3–2 || –
|- align="center" bgcolor="#ddffdd"
| February 12 ||  || No. 20 || Disch-Falk Field || W 14–2 || Simmons (W; 2–0) || 3,308 || 4–2 || –
|- align="center" bgcolor="#ddffdd"
| February 15 ||  || No. 20 || Disch-Falk Field || W 3–2 || Merle (W; 1–0) || 3,388 || 5–2 || –
|- align="center" bgcolor="#ddffdd"
| February 16 || Sam Houston State || No. 20 || Disch-Falk Field || W 23–0 || Bomer (W; 2–0) || 3,777 || 6–2 || –
|- align="center" bgcolor="#ddffdd"
| February 17 || Sam Houston State || No. 20 || Disch-Falk Field || W 13–1 || Halsey (W; 1–0) || 3,738 || 7–2 || –
|- align="center" bgcolor="#ddffdd"
| February 19 ||  || No. 18 || Disch-Falk Field || W 20–3 || Espinelli (W; 1–0) || 3,348 || 8–2 || –
|- align="center" bgcolor="#ddffdd"
| February 20 ||  || No. 18 || Disch-Falk Field || W 3–2 || France (W; 1–0) || 3,384 || 9–2 || –
|- align="center" bgcolor="#ddffdd"
| February 22 ||  || No. 18 || Disch-Falk Field || W 10–1 || Simmons (W; 3–0) || 3,503 || 10–2 || –
|- align="center" bgcolor="#ddffdd"
| February 23 || Loyola Marymount || No. 18 || Disch-Falk Field || W 17–3 || Bomer (W; 3–0) || 4,204 || 11–2 || –
|- align="center" bgcolor="#ddffdd"
| February 24 || Loyola Marymount || No. 18 || Disch-Falk Field || W 8–2 || Halsey (W; 2–0) || 3,739 || 12–2 || –
|- align="center" bgcolor="#ddffdd"
| February 26 || Texas A&M-Corpus Christi || No. 9 || Disch-Falk Field || W 12–2 || Clark (W; 1–1) || 3,210 || 13–2 || –
|-

|- align="center" bgcolor="ffdddd"
| March 1 || at No. 23  || No. 9 || Baylor Ballpark || L 4–5 || Merle (L; 1–1) || 3,361 || 13–3 || 0–1
|- align="center" bgcolor="#ddffdd"
| March 2 || No. 23 Baylor || No. 9 || Disch-Falk Field || W 4–3 || Simmons (W; 4–0) || 4,013 || 14–3 || 1–1
|- align="center" bgcolor="ffdddd"
| March 3 || No. 23 Baylor || No. 9 || Disch-Falk Field || L 4–11 || Bomer (L; 3–1) || 3,774 || 14–4 || 1–2
|- align="center" bgcolor="#ddffdd"
| March 5 ||  || No. 15 || Disch-Falk Field || W 2–1 || Street (W; 1–0) || 3,498 || 15–4 || –
|- align="center" bgcolor="ffdddd"
| March 8 || at  || No. 15 || Dan Law Field || L 5–10 || Street (L; 1–1) || 3,498 || 15–5 || 1–3
|- align="center" bgcolor="#ddffdd"
| March 9 || at Texas Tech || No. 15 || Dan Law Field || W 6–3 || Simmons (W; 5–0) || 3,429 || 16–5 || 2–3
|- align="center" bgcolor="ffdddd"
| March 10 || at Texas Tech || No. 15 || Dan Law Field || L 0–9 || Clark (L; 1–2) || 3,429 || 16–6 || 2–4
|- align="center" bgcolor="#ddffdd"
| March 12 || vs. TCU || No. 19 || Dell Diamond || W 5–1 || Espinelli (W; 2–0) || 3,661 || 17–6 || –
|- align="center" bgcolor="#ddffdd"
| March 15 || at Missouri || No. 19 || Taylor Stadium || W 15–0 || Halsey (W; 3–0) || 384 || 18–6 || 3–4
|- align="center" bgcolor="ddffdd"
| March 16 || at Missouri || No. 19 || Taylor Stadium || W 6–3 || Simmons (W; 6–0) || 378 || 19–6 || 4–4
|- align="center" bgcolor="ddffdd"
| March 17 || at Missouri || No. 19 || Taylor Stadium || W 7–2 || Clark (W; 2–2) || 393 || 20–6 || 5–4
|- align="center" bgcolor="ddffdd"
| March 19 ||  || No. 15 || Disch-Falk Field || W 14–0 || Espinelli (W; 3–0) || 3,342 || 21–6 || –
|- align="center" bgcolor="ddffdd"
| March 22 ||  || No. 15 || Disch-Falk Field || W 10–0 || Halsey (W; 4–0) || 3,402 || 22–6 || –
|- align="center" bgcolor="ddffdd"
| March 23 || Texas-Pan American || No. 15 || Disch-Falk Field || W 9–0 || Simmons (W; 7–0) || 4,634 || 23–6 || –
|- align="center" bgcolor="ddffdd"
| March 24 || Texas-Pan American || No. 15 || Disch-Falk Field || W 20–0 || Clark (W; 3–2) || 4,085 || 24–6 || –
|- align="center" bgcolor="ffdddd"
| March 28 || at No. 2 Stanford || No. 14 || Sunken Diamond || L 6–7 || Bomer (L; 3–2) || 2,310|| 24–7 || –
|- align="center" bgcolor="ddffdd"
| March 29 || at No. 2 Stanford || No. 14 || Sunken Diamond || W 2–0 || Simmons (W; 8–0) || 2,828 || 25–7 || –
|- align="center" bgcolor="ffdddd"
| March 30 || at No. 2 Stanford || No. 14 || Sunken Diamond || L 2–7 || Clark (W; 3–3) || 3,280 || 25–8 || –
|-

|- align="center" bgcolor="ddffdd"
| April 2 || UTSA || No. 15 || Disch-Falk Field || W 11–1 || Bomer (W; 4–2) || 3,691 || 26–8 || –
|- align="center" bgcolor="ffdddd"
| April 5 ||  || No. 15 || Disch-Falk Field || L 3–5 || Halsey (L; 4–1) || 3,659 || 26–9 || 5–5
|- align="center" bgcolor="ddffdd"
| April 6 || Kansas || No. 15 || Disch-Falk Field || W 8–3 || Simmons (W; 9–0) || 5,116 || 27–9 || 6–5
|- align="center" bgcolor="ddffdd"
| April 6 || Kansas || No. 15 || Disch-Falk Field || W 5–4 || Street (W; 2–1) || 5,116 || 28–9 || 7–5
|- align="center" bgcolor="ddffdd"
| April 9 || No. 4  || No. 15 || Disch-Falk Field || W 3–2 || Jordan (W; 1–1) || 4,154 || 29–9 || –
|- align="center" bgcolor="ffdddd"
| April 12 || at No. 23  || No. 15 || Mitchell Park || L 5–6 || Merle (L; 1–2) || 2,225 || 29–10 || 7–6
|- align="center" bgcolor="ddffdd"
| April 14 || at No. 23 Oklahoma || No. 15 || Mitchell Park || W 8–2 || Simmons (W; 10–0) || 1,850 || 30–10 || 8–6
|- align="center" bgcolor="ddffdd"
| April 14 || at No. 23 Oklahoma || No. 15 || Mitchell Park || W 8–1 || Bomer (W; 5–2) || 2,517 || 31–10 || 9–6
|- align="center" bgcolor="ddffdd"
| April 19 || at  || No. 14 || Tointon Family Stadium || W 6–0 || Halsey (W; 5–1) || 114 || 32–10 || 10–6
|- align="center" bgcolor="ddffdd"
| April 21 || at Kansas State || No. 14 || Tointon Family Stadium || W 8–4 || Simmons (W; 11–0) || 333 || 33–10 || 11–6
|- align="center" bgcolor="ddffdd"
| April 21 || at Kansas State || No. 14 || Tointon Family Stadium || W 8–2 || Bomer (W; 6–2) || 333 || 34–10 || 12–6
|- align="center" bgcolor="ffdddd"
| April 23 ||   || No. 8 || Disch-Falk Field || L 0–2 || Clark (L; 3–4) || 4,484 || 34-11 || –
|- align="center" bgcolor="ddffdd"
| April 26 || No. 16  || No. 8 || Disch-Falk Field || W 3–2 || Halsey (W; 6–1) || 4,678|| 35–11 || 13–6
|- align="center" bgcolor="ddffdd"
| April 27 || No. 16 Oklahoma State || No. 8 || Disch-Falk Field || W 2–1 || Simmons (W; 12–0) || 4,719 || 36–11 || 14–6
|- align="center" bgcolor="ddffdd"
| April 28 || No. 16 Oklahoma State || No. 8 || Disch-Falk Field || W 7–4 || Bomer (W; 7–2) || 4,440 || 37–11 || 15–6
|- align="center" bgcolor="ddffdd"
| April 30 || vs. TCU || No. 5 || Dell Diamond || W 14–8 || Muegge (W; 1–0) || 2,764 || 38–11 || –
|-

|- align="center" bgcolor="ffdddd"
| May 3 || No. 15 Nebraska || No. 5 || Disch-Falk Field || L 3–8 || Halsey (L; 6–2) || 4,671 || 38–12 || 15–7
|- align="center" bgcolor="ddffdd"
| May 4 || No. 15 Nebraska || No. 5 || Disch-Falk Field || W 3–2 || Simmons (W; 13–0) || 4,891 || 39–12 || 16–7
|- align="center" bgcolor="ffdddd"
| May 5 || No. 15 Nebraska || No. 5 || Disch-Falk Field || L 5–7 || Bomer (L; 7–3) || 4,740 || 39–13 || 16–8
|- align="center" bgcolor="ddffdd"
| May 14 || at No. 4 Rice || No. 8 || Reckling Park || W 4–2 || Muegge (W; 2–0) || 4,610 || 40–13 || -
|- align="center" bgcolor="ddffdd"
| May 17 || No. 24  || No. 8 || Disch-Falk Field || W 5–1 || Simmons (W; 14–0) || 6,709 || 41–13 || 17–8
|- align="center" bgcolor="ddffdd"
| May 18 || at No. 24 Texas A&M || No. 8 || Olsen Field || W 7–3 || Merle (W; 2–0) || 7,136  || 42–13 || 18–8
|- align="center" bgcolor="ddffdd"
| May 19 || at No. 24 Texas A&M || No. 8 || Olsen Field || W 7–4 || Espinelli (W; 4–0) || 5,922  || 43–13 || 19–8
|-

|-
! style="background:#BF5700;color:white;"| Post-Season (14–2)
|-

|- align="center" bgcolor="ffdddd"
| May 22 || vs. (8) Texas A&M || (1) No. 5 || Rangers Ballpark in Arlington || L 4–8 || Simmons (L; 14–1) || 13,641 || 43–14 || 0–1
|- align="center" bgcolor="ddffdd"
| May 23 || vs. (5) Oklahoma State || (1) No. 5 || Rangers Ballpark in Arlington || W 8–6 || Street (W; 3–1) || 7,411 || 44–14 || 1–1
|- align="center" bgcolor="ddffdd"
| May 24 || vs. (8) Texas A&M || (1) No. 5 || Rangers Ballpark in Arlington || W 9–4 || Bomer (W; 8–3) || 12,731 || 45–14 || 2–1
|- align="center" bgcolor="ddffdd"
| May 25 || vs. (4) No. 27 Oklahoma || (1) No. 5 || Rangers Ballpark in Arlington || W 2–1 || Clark (W; 4–4) || 12,846 || 46–14 || 3–1
|- align="center" bgcolor="ddffdd"
| May 25 || vs. (4) No. 27 Oklahoma || (1) No. 5 || Rangers Ballpark in Arlington || W 8–5 || Espinelli (W; 5–0) || 10,220 || 47–14 || 4–1
|- align="center" bgcolor="ddffdd"
| May 26 || vs. (2) No. 13 Nebraska || (1) No. 5 || Rangers Ballpark in Arlington || W 9–6 || Street (W; 4–1) || 13,327 || 48–14 || 5–1
|-

|- align="center" bgcolor="ddffdd"
| May 31 || vs. (4)  || (1) No. 3 || Disch-Falk Field || W 7–2 || Halsey (W; 7–2)|| 6,712 || 49–14 || 1–0
|- align="center" bgcolor="ddffdd"
| June 1 || vs. (2) Baylor || (1) No. 3 || Disch-Falk Field || W 10–8 || Clark (W; 5–4) || 6,848 || 50–14 || 2–0
|- align="center" bgcolor="ddffdd"
| June 2 || vs. (2) Baylor || (1) No. 3 || Disch-Falk Field || W 2–0 || Bomer (W; 9–3) || 7,223 || 51–14 || 3–0
|-

|- align="center" bgcolor="ffdddd"
| June 7 || vs. No. 6 Houston || (5) No. 3 || Disch-Falk Field || L 0–2 || Merle (L; 2–3) || 7,209 || 51–15 || 3–1
|- align="center" bgcolor="ddffdd"
| June 8 || vs. No. 6 Houston || (5) No. 3 || Disch-Falk Field || W 17–2 || Clark (W; 6–4) || 7,374 || 52–15 || 4–1
|- align="center" bgcolor="ddffdd"
| June 9 || vs. No. 6 Houston || (5) No. 3 || Disch-Falk Field || W 5–2 || Bomer (W; 10–3) || 7,277 || 53–15 || 5–1
|-

|- align="center" bgcolor="ddffdd"
| June 15 || vs. (4) No. 1 Rice || (5) No. 2 || Rosenblatt Stadium || W 2–1 || Simmons (W; 15–1) || 24,067 || 54–15 || 1–0
|- align="center" bgcolor="ddffdd"
| June 17 || vs. (8) No. 5 Stanford || (5) No. 2 || Rosenblatt Stadium || W 8–7 || Bomer (W; 11–3) || 24,971 || 55–15 || 2–0
|- align="center" bgcolor="ddffdd"
| June 20 || vs. (8) No. 5 Stanford || (5) No. 2 || Rosenblatt Stadium || W 6–5 || Merle (W; 13–3) || 21,554 || 56–15 || 3–0
|- align="center" bgcolor="ddffdd"
| June 22 || vs. (6) No. 3 South Carolina || (5) No. 2 || Rosenblatt Stadium || W 12–6 || Simmons (W; 16–1)|| 24,089 || 57–15 || 4–0
|-

Postseason

Big 12 tournament

NCAA tournament

Austin super regional

College World Series

CWS championship game

Awards and honors 
Ray Clark
 Big 12 All-Tournament Team

Eugene Espinelli
 All-Big 12 Honorable Mention

Brad Halsey
 All-Big 12 Second Team

Michael Hollimon
 All-Big 12 Second Team

Ryan Hubele
 All-Big 12 Honorable Mention

Dustin Majewski
 College World Series All-Tournament Team
 All-America Third Team
 All-Big 12 Honorable Mention
 Big 12 tournament Most Outstanding Player

Tim Moss
 College World Series All-Tournament Team
 ABCA Midwest All-Region Team First Team
 All-Big 12 First Team

Jeff Ontiveros
 ABCA Midwest All-Region Team Second Team
 All-Big 12 Second Team
 Big 12 All-Tournament Team

Omar Quintanilla
 College World Series All-Tournament Team
 ABCA Midwest All-Region Team Second Team
 All-Big 12 Second Team

J.D. Reininger
 All-Big 12 Honorable Mention
 Big 12 Freshman Player of the Year
 Big 12 All-Tournament Team

Justin Simmons
 College World Series All-Tournament Team
 All-America First Team
 ABCA Midwest All-Region Team First Team
 Big 12 Pitcher of the Year

Huston Street
 College World Series Most Outstanding Player
 All-Big 12 First Team
 Big 12 Freshman Pitcher of the Year
 Big 12 All-Tournament Team

Longhorns in the 2002 MLB Draft 
The following members of the Texas Longhorns baseball program were drafted in the 2002 Major League Baseball Draft.

Rankings

References 

Texas Longhorns
Texas Longhorns baseball seasons
College World Series seasons
NCAA Division I Baseball Championship seasons
Big 12 Conference baseball champion seasons
Texas Longhorns base
Texas